Vladimir Georgiyevich Kinelyov (born 28 January 1945, Ust-Kalmanka, Soviet Union) is a Russian former politician and professor. He was the Minister of Education and the Deputy Chairman of Government of the Russian Federation for education and science during the 1990s, under President Boris Yeltsin.

In government
He served as deputy prime minister in 1996 and was education minister of Russia from 1996 until 1998.

References

1945 births
20th-century Russian politicians
Government ministers of Russia
Education ministers of Russia
Russian educators
Deputy heads of government of the Russian Federation
Living people